Alexei Mikhailovich Lidov (Russian: Алексей́ Михай́лович Ли́дов) is a Russian art historian and byzantinist, an author of the concepts hierotopy and spatial icon, member of the Russian Academy of Arts.

Life and career 
Lidov was born in Moscow on March 9, 1959. His father, Mikhail Lidov, was a Russian space scientist; his mother, Diana – a mathematician. Upon the graduation from the department of art history of the Moscow State University in 1981, his first appointment was at the State Museum of Oriental Art in Moscow. He earned a PhD in art history from the Moscow State University in 1989. In 1991 he founded the Research Center for the Eastern Christian Culture, an independent non-governmental organization, and has worked as its director. In  2008—2009 he served as the vice-president of the Russian Academy of Art. Since  2010 he works at the Institute of World Culture at the Moscow State University as director of the Department of Ancient Culture. Lidov has lectured at Princeton, Harvard, Columbia, Oxford, Cambridge, Sorbonne universities et al. He initiated several research programs and organized nine international symposia on iconographical and hierotopical subjects.

Research
During his studies at the University of Moscow Lidov specialized in the Byzantine art history. While working as a researcher at the State Museum of Oriental Art, he studied the Christian art of Armenia and Georgia. Building upon the material of his PhD thesis, he published in 1991 his first book about the mural paintings of the Akhtala monastery in Armenia. In this book he characterized the art of chalcedonian Armenians as a separate iconographic tradition, which combined Byzantine, Georgian and Armenian elements.

Drawing upon the seminal works of A. Grabar, H.Belting, H. Maguire and Chr. Walter, Lidov developed a method of interpretational iconography, which he put into practice in his study of liturgical themes in the Byzantine art and of the symbolism of Heavenly Jerusalem. Lidov has shown that new theological ideas, formulated in the wake of the Great Schism of 1054, engendered a new kind of Byzantine church iconography with the dominant themes of Christ the Priest and the Communion of the Apostles. After his trip to the Saint Catherine's Monastery in 1996, Lidov published a book-album with the description of its unique collection of icons.

Later Lidov turned to the study of miracle-working icons and Christian relics, which was quite a new subject in art history. In 2000 he initiated a program of research and cultural activities “Christian relics”, which included, in particular, two exhibitions and an international conference. During this period Lidov wrote several papers on the Hodegetria of Constantinople and the Holy Mandylion. While studying the role of miraculous icons and relics in the formation of sacred spaces in the Eastern Christian tradition, Lidov has formulated a new concept of hierotopy. The term hierotopy has two meanings. It is the creation of sacred spaces as a special form of human creativity and also a related academic field, which spans art history, archaeology, anthropology, and religious studies. Hierotopy accounts not only for artistic images and the symbolic world they form, but also for the entire collection of various media that serve to organize a sacred space into a spatial icon. The perception of sacred spaces has been analyzed by Lidov in terms of image-paradigms, which reflect the experience of a sacred space in its wholeness and are distinct from any illustrative pictures.

Awards and honors
 Russian Academy of Arts – corresponding member since 2007, full member since 2012
 Gold medal of the Russian Academy of Arts for the book.
 Distinguished visiting professor of the University of York, 2011
 The Medal of Merit of the Russian Academy of Arts, 2014
 The Order for Merits to Arts conferred by the Russian Academy of Arts, 2014
 The Order of Friendship of the Republic of Armenia, 2016
 Christensen Fellow at St Catherine's College, Oxford, 2017

References

Books (author) 
 The Mural Paintings of Akhtala. Moscow, 1991
 Byzantine Icons of Sinai. Moscow-Athens, 1999
 The Holy Face in Russian Icons. Moscow, 2005 (with L. Evseeva and N. Chugreeva)
 Hierotopy. Spatial Icons and Image-paradigms in Byzantine Culture. Moscow, 2010
 The Icon. The World of the Holy Images in Byzantium and the Medieval Russia. Moscow: Theoria, 2013
 The Wall Paintings of Akhtala Monastery. History, Iconography, Masters.  Moscow: Dmitry Pozharsky University, 2014

Books (editor) 
 Jerusalem in the Russian culture. Moscow, 1994
 Eastern Christian Churches. Liturgy and art. Moscow, 1994
 Miracle-working icons in Byzantium and old Russia, 1996
 The Miraculos image. Icons of Our Lady in the Tretyakov gallery. Moscow, 1999
 Christian relics in the Moscow Kremlin. Moscow, 2000
 Iconostasis: origins, evolution, symbolism. Moscow, 2000
 Eastern Christian relics. Moscow, 2003
 Relics in Byzantium and Medieval Russia. Written sources. Moscow, 2006
 Hierotopy. Creation of sacred spaces in Byzantium and Medieval Russia. Moscow, 2006
 Spatial icons. Textual and performative. Materials of the international symposium. Moscow, 2009
 Hierotopy. Comparative studies of sacred spaces. Moscow, 2009
 New Jerusalems. Hierotopy and iconography of sacred spaces. Moscow, 2009
 Spatial icons. Performativity in Byzantium and Medieval Russia. Moscow, 2011
 Hierotopy of Light and Fire in the Culture of the Byzantine World. Moscow, 2013
 The Life-Giving Source. Water in the hierotopy and iconography of the Christian world. Materials of the international symposium. Moscow, 2014.
 Holy water in the hierotopy and iconography of the Christian World. Moscow, 2017
 Air and heavens in the hierotopy and iconography of the Christian world. Materials of the international symposium. Moscow, 2019.
 The hierotopy of holy mountains in Christian culture. Moscow, 2019

Books dedicated to Lidov's 60th anniversary 
 Space of the icon. Iconography and hierotopy. Moscow, 2019 (eds. M. Bacci, J. Bogdanovich)
 Icons of space. Advances in hierotopy. London&NY, 2021 (ed. J. Bogdanovich)

Selected publications 
 L’Image du Christ-prelat dans le programme iconographique de Sainte Sophia d’Ohride. In: Arte Cristiana, fasc. 745. Milano, 1991, p. 245–250
 L’art des Armeniens Chalcedoniens Atti del Quinto Simposio Internazionale di Arte Armena 1988, Venezia 1992, pp. 479–495
 Christ the Priest in Byzantine Church Decoration of the Eleventh and Twelfth Centuries. Selected papers of the 18th International Congress of Byzantine Studies. Moscow, 1991. Vol.III: Art History, Architecture, Music. Shepherdstown, WV, 1996, pp. 158–170
 Byzantine Church Decoration and the Schism of 1054. Byzantion, LXVIII/2 (1998), pp. 381–405.
 Heavenly Jerusalem: the Byzantine Approach. In: «The Real and Ideal Jerusalem in Art of Judaism, Christianity and Islam». Jerusalem, 1998, pp. 341–353
 Byzantine Church Decoration and the Schism of 1054. Byzantion, LXVIII/2 (1998), pp. 381–405
 Miracle-Working Icons of the Mother of God. In: «Mother of God. Representation of the Virgin in Byzantine Art». Athens, ‘Skira’, 2000, pp. 47–57
 The Miracle of Reproduction. The Mandylion and Keramion as a paradigm of sacred space. In: «L’Immagine di Cristo dall. Acheropiita dalla mano d’artista» Editors C. Frommel and G. Wolf. Citta del Vaticano. Rome, 2006
 The Flying Hodegetria. The Miraculous Icon as Bearer of Sacred Space. In: «The Miraculous Image in the Late Middle Ages and Renaissance». Editors E. Thuno, G. Wolf. Rome, 2004
 Leo the Wise and the Miraculous Icons in Hagia Sophia. In: «The Heroes of the Orthodox Church. The New Saints, 8th to 16th century». Editor E. Kountura-Galaki. Athens, 2004
 The Canopy over the Holy Sepulchre: On the Origins of Onion-Shaped Domes. In: «Jerusalem in Russian Culture». New York, 2005
 «Il Dio russo». Culto e iconografia di San Nikola nell’antica Russia. In: «San Nicola. Splendori d’arte d’Oriente e d’Occidente». Editor M. Bacci. Milano, 2006
 The Mandylion over the Gate. A mental pilgrimage to the holy city of Edessa. In: "Routes of Faith in the Medieval Mediterranean. Thessaloniki, 2008, pp.179–192.
 'Image-Paradigms' as a Notion of Mediterranean Visual Culture: a Hierotopic Approach to Art History. In: «Crossing Cultures. Papers of the International Congress of Art History». CIHA 2008. Melbourne, 2009, pp. 177–183
 A Byzantine Jerusalem.The Imperial Pharos Chapel as the Holy Sepulchre In: Jerusalem as Narrative Space, ed. Annette Hoffmann and Gerhard Wolf, Leiden, Boston: Koninklijke Brill, 2012, pp. 63–104.
 The Temple Veil as a Spatial Icon. Revealing an Image-Paradigm of Medieval Iconography and Hierotopy. IKON, 2014, 7, pp. 97–108.

External links
 Lidov on the site of the Russian Academy of Art (in Russian)
 Lidov on the site of the Institute of World Culture (in Russian)
 The Weitzmann lecture announcement in 2008 at Princeton
 Preservation of the Orthodox cultural heritage in Kosovo, report to the UNESCO
 Lidov's interview to a Russian newspaper related to the problem of the restitution of the church property (in Russian)
 Lidov's lectures at the University of Budapesht

Russian art historians
Russian Byzantinists
Russian medievalists
Full Members of the Russian Academy of Arts
1959 births
Writers from Moscow
Living people
20th-century Russian historians
21st-century Russian historians
Historians of Byzantine art